The 1878 Invercargill by-election was a by-election during the 6th New Zealand Parliament in the Southland electorate of Invercargill. The by-election occurred following the resignation of MP George Lumsden and was won by Henry Feldwick.

Background
George Lumsden, who was first elected to represent Invercargill in the 1875 election, resigned in 1878. This triggered the Invercargill by-election, which was held on 17 July 1878. Two independent candidates contested the election, Henry Feldwick and James Walker Bain. Feldwick obtained 51.22% of the votes and was successful.

Previous election

Results

See also
List of New Zealand by-elections
1873 Invercargill by-election
1930 Invercargill by-election

References

1878 elections in New Zealand
Inver
Politics of Southland, New Zealand